Krikor is a Western Armenian given name, equivalent to Eastern Armenian given name Grigor and the English equivalent Gregory and its variants in different languages. A diminutive of the name is Koko.

Notable people with the name include:

Religion
Gregory of Narek (951–1003), or Krikor Naregatsi, Armenian monk, poet, mystical philosopher, theologian and saint of the Armenian Apostolic Church
Catholicoi
Gregory the Illuminator, patron saint and first official head of the Armenian Apostolic Church
Gregory II the Martyrophile, Catholicos of the Armenian Apostolic Church (1066-1105)
Gregory IV the Young (1173–1193)
Gregory V of Cilicia (1193–1194)
Gregory VI of Cilicia (1194–1203)
Gregory VII of Cilicia (1293–1307)
Gregory VIII of Cilicia (1411–1418) 
Gregory IX of Cilicia (1439–1446) 
Gregory X (1443–1465)
Gregory XI (1536–1545)
Gregory XII (1576–1590)

Armenian Patriarchs of Jerusalem 
Krikor Yetesattzi of Jerusalem (669–696)
Patriarch Krikor of Jerusalem (981–1006)
Patriarch Krikor of Jerusalem (1356–1363) 
Patriarch Krikor Kantzagehtzee of Jerusalem (1613–1645)
Krikor Shiravantzee (Chainbearer) (1715–1749)
Armenian patriarchs of Constantinople 
Patriarch Krikor I of Constantinople (1526–1537)
Patriarch Krikor II of Constantinople (1601–1608, 1611–1621, 1623–1626)
Patriarch Krikor III of Constantinople (1764–1773)
Patriarch Krikor IV of Constantinople (1801–1802)
Contemporary
Krikor Bedros XV Agagianian or Grégoire-Pierre Agagianian, Patriarch Catholicos of Cilicia of the Armenian Catholic Church (1937-1962) and Catholic cardinal. Prefect of the Congregation for the Evangelization of Peoples (1958–1970)
Krikor Balakian (1875–1934), Armenian bishop
Krikor Bedros XX Gabroyan (born 1934), Patriarch-Catholicos of the Armenian Catholic Church

Persons carrying the name Krikor
Krikor Agathon (1901-1979), Egyptian sport shooter, fencer and Olympian
Krikor Agopian (born 1942), Lebanese Armenian painter
Krikor Alozian (born 1979), Lebanese Armenian footballer
Krikor Amirian (1888–1964), Armenian Revolutionary, who participated in the establishment of the First Republic of Armenia
Krikor Ayvazian (1912-1997), Armenian Catholic Bishop of Qamishli
Krikor Azaryan (1934–2009), Bulgarian Armenian theatre director
Krikor Balyan, Armenian architect
Krikor Beledian (born 1945), Lebanese-born Armenian writer, literary critic, and translator living in France
Krikor Kalfayan (1873-1949), Armenian writer, lecturer, musician, and musicologist
Krikor Mekhitarian (born 1986), Brazilian Armenian chess grandmaster
Krikor Odian (1834-1887), Ottoman Armenian jurist, politician and writer
Krikor Ohanian, original name of Mike Connors, American actor
Krikor Pambuccian (1915–1996), Armenian–Romanian professor of pathology 
Krikor Peshtimaldjian (1778-1839), Ottoman Armenian philosopher, educator, translator, and linguist
Krikor Zohrab (1861–1915), Ottoman Armenian writer

Persons carrying the name Kirkor
Kirkor Kirkorov or Krikor Kirkorian (born 1968), Bulgarian Armenian boxer

Others
Grégoire Aslan (Coco) born Krikor Aslanian (1908–1982), Swiss ethnic Armenian actor and musician
Gregor (musician) (1898-1971), born Krikor Kélékian, jazz bandleader

See also
Grigor
Krikorian
Gregory (given name) and variant Gregor

Armenian masculine given names

hy:Գրիգոր